Naldo, real name Ednaldo Mendes da Conceição, (born February 6, 1976 in Rio de Janeiro) is a Brazilian soccer striker.  He currently plays for California Cougars of the Major Indoor Soccer League.

Naldo came up through the system of hometown Fluminense in 1996. He also played for Internacional and Tubarão and had a short spell with Turkey's Galatasaray. In 2002, Naldo moved to Switzerland, where he played for FC Wil, FC Luzern, and FC St. Gallen. He signed with Major League Soccer and the Los Angeles Galaxy in 2005, but was released after a disappointing season and a single game in 2006.  He switch to indoor soccer and joined California Cougars for the 2007-2008 season.

Honors

Los Angeles Galaxy
Major League Soccer MLS Cup (1): 2005

References

1976 births
Living people
Brazilian expatriate footballers
Brazilian expatriate sportspeople in Switzerland
Brazilian expatriate sportspeople in Turkey
Brazilian expatriate sportspeople in the United States
Brazilian footballers
California Cougars players
Expatriate footballers in Switzerland
Expatriate soccer players in the United States
Expatriate footballers in Turkey
FC Luzern players
FC St. Gallen players
FC Wil players
Fluminense FC players
Association football forwards
LA Galaxy players
Major Indoor Soccer League (2001–2008) players
Major League Soccer players
Footballers from Rio de Janeiro (city)
Sport Club Internacional players